Amy Costello  (born 14 January 1998) is a Scottish field hockey player who plays as a defender in the German Women's Feldhockey Bundesliga for UHC Hamburg and for the Scotland and Great Britain national teams.

Club career
She plays club hockey in the German Women's Feldhockey Bundesliga for UHC Hamburg.

Costello previously played in the Women's England Hockey League Premier Division for East Grinstead.
She has also played for University of Birmingham and Edinburgh University Women's Hockey Club.

International career
She was included in the Great Britain squad for the women's field hockey tournament at the 2020 Summer Olympics, held in July and August 2021. Though designated as an alternate player, due to rule changes caused by the COVID-19 pandemic she was eligible to compete in all matches (unlike previous tournaments, in which alternates could only compete after permanently replacing an injured player). Though Great Britain earned the bronze medal, she did not make an appearance and was therefore ineligible to receive a medal.

References

External links

Living people
1998 births
People educated at the Mary Erskine School
Sportspeople from Edinburgh
Scottish female field hockey players
Field hockey players at the 2018 Commonwealth Games
Women's England Hockey League players
East Grinstead Hockey Club players
University of Birmingham Hockey Club players
Commonwealth Games competitors for Scotland
Field hockey players at the 2020 Summer Olympics
Olympic field hockey players of Great Britain
Uhlenhorster HC players